Wayne Thomas may refer to:

 Wayne Thomas (ice hockey) (born 1947), Canadian ice hockey goaltender
 Wayne B. Thomas (born 1969), American economist
 Wayne Thomas (bobsleigh) (born 1966), Jamaican Olympic bobsledder
 Wayne Thomas (footballer, born 1978), English footballer
 Wayne Thomas (footballer, born 1979), English footballer
 Wayne Thomas (Welsh footballer)
 Wayne Thomas (musician), of the band Trampolene
 Wayne Thomas (wrestler) (born 1959), Olympic wrestler

See also